William Wray Maunsell (1782-1860) was an Anglican priest in Ireland in the 19th Century.

He was born in Limerick and educated at Trinity College Dublin. He was  Rector of Drishane from 1803 to 1814; and Archdeacon of Limerick from 1814 until his death.

References

Archdeacons of Limerick
Alumni of Trinity College Dublin
19th-century Irish Anglican priests
Church of Ireland priests
1860 deaths
1782 births